General elections were held in Montenegro, at the time a constituent republic of Yugoslavia, on 20 December 1992. A second round of the presidential election was held on 10 January 1993. The elections were seen as a referendum on independence for Montenegro, and were won by then Serbian-Montenegrin unionist centre-left Democratic Party of Socialists of Montenegro (DPS CG) who also favoured greater autonomy within federation with Serbia. The presidential elections were won by the DPS leader Momir Bulatović, who received 63% of the vote in the second round. The result of the parliamentary elections was a victory for the Democratic Party of Socialists which succeed ruling League of Communists. DPS won 46 of the 85 seats.

Background

The breakup of Yugoslavia drew new boundaries in the Montenegrin political scene. The League of Communists of Montenegro formally changed their identity, renaming themselves the Democratic Party of Socialists. After the president of DPS, Momir Bulatović, initially showed support for Carrington's 1991 peace plan, he was summoned to Belgrade by Borisav Jović and Slobodan Milošević, who persuaded him to reverse his commitment to Carrington. As a result, Bulatović no longer pursued Montenegrin independence under the Carrington model and agreed to holding an independence referendum in 1992. Although there was a boycott among those who wanted independence, Montenegrin voters chose to remain within Yugoslavia. Even so, Bulatović's brief support for the Carrington plan deeply shook Milošević's confidence in him as a political ally. Milošević ultimately supported Branko Kostić, also from DPS, ahead of the presidential election in 1993.

Results

National Assembly

President

Aftermath
Shortly after the elections, the Social Democratic Party of Reformists (SDPR) merged with the Socialist Party of Montenegro to form the Social Democratic Party (SDP). The four SDPR MPs formed the newly-formed SDP parliamentary group.

References

Bibliography

Elections in Montenegro
Montenegro
General
Elections in Serbia and Montenegro
Presidential elections in Montenegro
Montenegro
Montenegro
General
Montenegro